Arnaud Beauville (born 10 May 1947) is a French mathematician, whose research interest is algebraic geometry.

Beauville earned his doctorate from Paris Diderot University in 1977, with a thesis regarding Prym varieties and the Schottky problem, under supervision of Jean-Louis Verdier.

He has been a professor at the Université Paris-Sud, then Director of the Mathematics Department at the École Normale Supérieure. He is currently Professor emeritus at the Université de Nice Sophia-Antipolis.

Beauville was a visiting scholar at the Institute for Advanced Study in the summer of 1982. He was an invited speaker at the International Congress of Mathematicians in 1986 at Berkeley. He was a member of Bourbaki.
He has had 25 Ph.D. students, among them Claire Voisin, Olivier Debarre, Yves Laszlo.

In 2012 he became a fellow of the American Mathematical Society.

See also
Beauville surface

References

External links
Personal website

1947 births
Living people
École Normale Supérieure alumni
20th-century French mathematicians
21st-century French mathematicians
Algebraic geometers
Paris Diderot University alumni
Academic staff of the University of Angers
Academic staff of Paris-Sud University
Institute for Advanced Study visiting scholars
Fellows of the American Mathematical Society
Nicolas Bourbaki